Angelo Carossino (21 February 1929 – 25 July 2020) was an Italian politician who served as Mayor of Savona (1958–1967), President of Liguria (1975–1979) and member of the European Parliament (1979–1989). He was born in Genoa and was a member of the ICP.

References

1929 births
2020 deaths
Mayors of Savona
Presidents of Liguria